"Hold On" is a song by American R&B singer Tanya Blount. It was the third single released from, Natural Thing.

Track listing
Maxi-Promo CD
1.) Hold On (Radio Edit 1)
2.) Hold On (Radio Edit 2)
3.) Hold On (Alternative Take Mix)
4.) Hold On (LP Version)

Charts

References

1995 singles
Tanya Blount songs
1994 songs